Kulich is the Russian name for Easter bread. For the Eastern Slavs, festive bread was round and tall, and dough decorations were made on top of it. The cylindrical shape of the cake is associated with the church practice of baking artos. The Paska bread tradition spread in cultures which were connected to the Byzantine Empire and it's a traditional cultural part of countries with an Orthodox Christian population. It is eaten in countries like Russia, Belarus, Ukraine, Romania, Georgia, Moldova, North Macedonia and Serbia. Kulich is a variant of paska Easter breads and represents not only Easter but also the spring. Easter is a very important celebration in Eastern European countries, even more important than Christmas.

Preparation
Traditionally after the Easter service, the kulich, which has been put into a basket and decorated with colorful flowers, is blessed by the priest. Blessed kulich is eaten before breakfast each day. Any leftover kulich that is not blessed is eaten with paskha for dessert.

Kulich is baked in tall, cylindrical tins (like coffee or fruit juice tins). When cooled, kulich is decorated with white icing (which slightly drizzles down the sides) and colorful flowers.

Kulich is only eaten between Easter and Pentecost.

The recipe for kulich is similar to that of Italian panettone, but is more dense and thus weighs considerably more.

Gallery

See also
Cozonac
List of sweet breads
Panettone
Paska (bread)
Pinca
Red Easter eggs
Stollen

Notes

References

External links
Kulich recipe (in Russian, with photos)

Belarusian desserts
Russian desserts
Soviet cuisine
Easter bread
Slavic Easter traditions
Yeast cakes